The 2013–14 East Carolina Pirates men's basketball team represented East Carolina University during the 2013–14 NCAA Division I men's basketball season. The Pirates, led by fourth year head coach Jeff Lebo, played their home games at Williams Arena at Minges Coliseum and were members of Conference USA. They finished the season 17–17, 5–11 in C-USA play to finish in a tie for 12th place. They advanced to the second round of the C-USA tournament where they lost to UTEP. They were invited to the CollegeInsider.com Tournament where they lost in the first round to Wright State.

This was their final year as a member of Conference USA as they will move to the American Athletic Conference in July 2014.

Roster

Schedule

|-
!colspan=9 style="background:#4F0076; color:#FFE600;"| Regular season

|-
!colspan=9 style="background:#4F0076; color:#FFE600;"| Conference USA tournament

|-
!colspan=9 style="background:#4F0076; color:#FFE600;"| CIT

References

East Carolina Pirates men's basketball seasons
East Carolina
East Carolina
East Carolina Pirates
East Carolina Pirates